Grenada competed at the 2004 Summer Olympics in Athens, Greece, from 13 to 29 August 2004. This was the nation's sixth consecutive appearance at the Olympics.

Grenada Olympic Committee sent a total of five athletes (three men and two women), competing only in athletics and swimming. Track runner and world indoor champion Alleyne Francique was appointed by the committee to become the nation's flag bearer in the opening ceremony.  A top favorite in the men's 400 metres, Francique narrowly missed a chance to grab the nation's first ever Olympic medal with a fantastic fourth-place finish.

Athletics 

Grenadan athletes have so far achieved qualifying standards in the following athletics events (up to a maximum of 3 athletes in each event at the 'A' Standard, and 1 at the 'B' Standard). 

Men
Track & road events

Field events

Women
Track & road events

Key
Note–Ranks given for track events are within the athlete's heat only
Q = Qualified for the next round
q = Qualified for the next round as a fastest loser or, in field events, by position without achieving the qualifying target
NR = National record
N/A = Round not applicable for the event
Bye = Athlete not required to compete in round

Swimming 

Men

Women

See also
Grenada at the 2003 Pan American Games

References

External links
Official Report of the XXVIII Olympiad

Nations at the 2004 Summer Olympics
2004
Summer Olympics